The Turkish Constitutional Reform were amendments made to the Constitution of Turkey in 2017. The reform was backed by the governing Justice and Development Party and the Nationalist Movement Party. The reform altered the elections of the Supreme Board of Judges and Prosecutors, the Presidency, and the Parliament. It saw the transformation of Turkey's semi-presidential system into a presidential system one with the abolition of the office of the Prime Minister of Turkey and the transfer of executive authority to the President of Turkey.

Constitutional amendments

Referendum

All eighteen proposed amendments to the constitution were approved by parliamentary vote on 20 January 2017. A national referendum was held in 17 April 2017 to confirm the proposed reforms. A majority of 51.41% voted "yes" to approve the proposal with a turnout rate of 85.43%.

Reforms on Authorities of President
 President is head of state and head of government
 Appoints Vice President and Ministries
 Appoints 4 members of Supreme Board of Judges and Prosecutors and 12 members of Constitutional Court
 Can dissolve the Parliament but President will also go to elections if President does it.
 Can declare State of Emergency.
 Make the budget and send to Parliament.
 Can make bylaws about executive. These bylaws will be examined by Constitutional Court.

Reforms on Authorities of Parliament 
Parliament is the head of legislative.
 Has 600 MPs.
 Detects President's cabinet and Vice President with Parliamentary Research, Parliamentary Investigation, General Discussion and Written Question.
 Appoints 7 members of Supreme Board of Judges and Prosecutors and 3 members of Constitutional Court.
 Can dissolve President but the Parliament will also go to the elections.
 Investigating possible crimes committed by the President can begin in Parliament with a three-fifths vote in favour.
 Approve or disapprove bylaws made by President.
 Approve or disapprove State of Emergency. State of Emergency can be extended, shorten or removed by Parliament.
 Approve or disapprove the budget made by President.

Reforms of elections
 Elections will be held in every five years for both Parliament and Presidency.
 A president can be a candidate for only two times.
 Election and Selection age is 18.

References

Politics of Turkey